IFK Arboga IK is an ice-hockey club from Arboga in Sweden. The team is currently playing in the fourth league level in Sweden, Division 2.

Ice hockey teams in Sweden
Ice hockey teams in Västmanland County
Idrottsföreningen Kamraterna
Ice hockey clubs established in 1897